Sean Thomas Strickland (born February 27, 1991) is an American mixed martial artist who currently competes in the middleweight division of the Ultimate Fighting Championship (UFC). A professional competitor since 2008, he is the former King of the Cage Middleweight Champion. As of July 4, 2022, he is #7 in the UFC middleweight rankings.

Background
Strickland grew up in Corona, California, in a household with a physically and mentally abusive father. Angered by the circumstances at home, Strickland got kicked out of every school he attended. Strickland began training in mixed martial arts at the age of 14 and turned professional at the age of 16.

Mixed martial arts career

King of the Cage
Strickland made his professional debut in 2008 for the King of the Cage promotion and compiled an undefeated record of 9–0 before facing Josh Bryant in a fight for the King of the Cage Middleweight Championship at KOTC: Unification on December 9, 2012. Strickland won via split decision, and then successfully defended his title three times before being signed by the UFC.

Ultimate Fighting Championship

Early career 
Strickland made his UFC debut at UFC 171 on March 15, 2014, facing Bubba McDaniel. Strickland won via rear-naked choke submission in the first round.

Strickland made his next appearance at UFC Fight Night 41 against Luke Barnatt on May 31, 2014. Strickland won via split decision.

Strickland faced Santiago Ponzinibbio in a welterweight bout on February 22, 2015, at UFC Fight Night 61.  Strickland lost the back and forth fight via unanimous decision.

Strickland faced Igor Araújo on July 15, 2015, at UFC Fight Night 71.  He won the fight by unanimous decision.

Strickland faced Alex Garcia on February 21, 2016, at UFC Fight Night 83. After a back-and-forth first two rounds, Strickland won the fight via TKO in the third round.

Strickland next faced Tom Breese on June 4, 2016, at UFC 199. He won the fight via split decision.

Strickland was expected to face Tim Means on August 20, 2016, at UFC 202. However Strickland pulled out of the fight in early August citing a knee injury. He was replaced by promotional newcomer Sabah Homasi.

Strickland faced Kamaru Usman on April 8, 2017, at UFC 210. He lost the fight via unanimous decision.

Strickland faced Court McGee on November 11, 2017, at UFC Fight Night 120. This fight was back and forth for all three rounds and was initially announced a majority draw with scores of 30-27, 29-29, and 29-29.  After the fight it was revealed there was an error in calculating the judges scorecards and Strickland was declared the winner by unanimous decision.

Strickland faced Elizeu Zaleski dos Santos on May 12, 2018, at UFC 224. He lost the fight via knockout in the first round.

Strickland faced Nordine Taleb on October 27, 2018, at UFC Fight Night 138. He won the fight via technical knockout in the second round. Strickland became a free agent after the fight by fighting out his contract.

Return from injury 
Returning from a two-year layoff after motorcycle accident, Strickland was scheduled to face Wellington Turman on October 31, 2020, at UFC Fight Night 181.  However on September 29, Turman pulled out due to COVID-19 sequelae that rendered him unable to train after his two-week quarantine ended on September 2, and he was replaced by Jack Marshman. At the weight-ins, Marshman weighed in at 187.5 pounds, one and a half pounds over the middleweight non-title fight limit. The bout proceeded at catchweight and Marshman was fined a percentage of his purses, which went to Strickland. Strickland won the fight via unanimous decision.

Strickland faced Brendan Allen on November 14, 2020, at UFC Fight Night: Felder vs. dos Anjos. He won the fight via technical knockout. This win earned him the Performance of the Night awards.

Strickland faced Krzysztof Jotko on May 1, 2021, at UFC on ESPN: Reyes vs. Procházka. He won the bout via unanimous decision.

Strickland was expected to face Uriah Hall on August 7, 2021, at UFC 265. However on June 4, 2021, the bout with Hall was moved to headline UFC on ESPN 28 on July 31, 2021. During his training camp in the build up to this fight, he got into a physical altercation with sparring partner Orlando Sanchez (BJJ), who he accused of using a potentially dangerous submission which could easily injure him. Strickland defeated Hall via unanimous decision.

Strickland was scheduled to face former UFC Middleweight Champion Luke Rockhold on November 6, 2021, at UFC 268. However, on October 11 Rockhold withdrew due to a herniated disc.

Strickland faced Jack Hermansson on February 5, 2022, at UFC Fight Night 200. He won the fight via split decision. 21 out of 21 media outlets scored the fight for Strickland. Judge Sal D'Amato, who scored the fight 48-47 for Hermansson, received widespread criticism for his scorecard.

Strickland was scheduled to face Alex Pereira on July 30, 2022, at UFC 277.  However, the promotion decided to move the pairing to UFC 276 on July 2, 2022. Strickland lost the fight via knockout in the first round.

Strickland was scheduled to face Jared Cannonier on October 15, 2022, at UFC Fight Night 212. However, the bout was scrapped after Strickland withdrew due to a finger infection. The pair was rebooked for UFC Fight Night 216 on December 17, 2022. Strickland lost the fight via split decision.

In a quick turn around, Strickland faced Nassourdine Imavov, replacing Kelvin Gastelum in a light heavyweight bout on January 14, 2023, at UFC Fight Night: Strickland vs. Imavov. He won the fight via unanimous decision.

Personal life
In December 2018, Strickland was hit by a car while he was riding a motorcycle in Los Angeles, rendering him unconscious. He suffered numerous injuries and needed a knee operation after the accident.

Strickland has admitted to being a neo-Nazi during his youth. He stopped after befriending people of different races who helped him. Strickland's father passed away as a result of cancer.

Championships and achievements
Ultimate Fighting Championship
Performance of the Night (One time) 
King of the Cage
KOTC Middleweight Championship (One time)
Five successful title defenses
MMAjunkie.com
2020 Comeback Fighter of the Year
Sherdog
2020 Comeback Fighter of the Year

Mixed martial arts record

|Win
|align=center|26–5
|Nassourdine Imavov
|Decision (unanimous)
|UFC Fight Night: Strickland vs. Imavov
|
|align=center|5
|align=center|5:00
|Las Vegas, Nevada, United States
|
|-
|Loss
|align=center|25–5
|Jared Cannonier
|Decision (split)
|UFC Fight Night: Cannonier vs. Strickland
| 
|align=center|5
|align=center|5:00
|Las Vegas, Nevada, United States
|
|-
|Loss
|align=center|25–4
|Alex Pereira
|KO (punches)
|UFC 276
| 
|align=center|1
|align=center|2:36
|Las Vegas, Nevada, United States
|
|-
|Win
|align=center|25–3
|Jack Hermansson
|Decision (split)
|UFC Fight Night: Hermansson vs. Strickland
| 
|align=center|5
|align=center|5:00
|Las Vegas, Nevada, United States
|
|-
|Win
|align=center|24–3
|Uriah Hall
|Decision (unanimous)
|UFC on ESPN: Hall vs. Strickland 
|
|align=center|5
|align=center|5:00
|Las Vegas, Nevada, United States
|
|-
|Win
|align=center|23–3
|Krzysztof Jotko
|Decision (unanimous)
|UFC on ESPN: Reyes vs. Procházka
|
|align=center|3
|align=center|5:00
|Las Vegas, Nevada, United States
|
|-
|Win
|align=center|22–3
|Brendan Allen
|TKO (punches)
|UFC Fight Night: Felder vs. dos Anjos
|
|align=center|2
|align=center|1:32
|Las Vegas, Nevada, United States
|
|-
|Win
|align=center|21–3
|Jack Marshman
|Decision (unanimous)
|UFC Fight Night: Hall vs. Silva
|
|align=center|3
|align=center|5:00
|Las Vegas, Nevada, United States
|
|-
|Win
|align=center|20–3
|Nordine Taleb
|TKO (punches)
|UFC Fight Night: Volkan vs. Smith 
|
|align=center|2
|align=center|3:10
|Moncton, New Brunswick, Canada
|  
|-
|Loss
|align=center|19–3
|Elizeu Zaleski dos Santos
|KO (spinning wheel kick and punches)
|UFC 224
|
|align=center|1
|align=center|3:40
|Rio de Janeiro, Brazil
|
|-
|Win
|align=center|19–2
|Court McGee
|Decision (unanimous)
|UFC Fight Night: Poirier vs. Pettis
|
|align=center|3
|align=center|5:00
|Norfolk, Virginia, United States
|
|-
|Loss
|align=center|18–2
|Kamaru Usman
|Decision (unanimous)
|UFC 210
|
|align=center|3
|align=center|5:00
|Buffalo, New York, United States
| 
|-
|Win
|align=center|18–1
|Tom Breese
|Decision (split)
|UFC 199
|
|align=center|3
|align=center|5:00
|Inglewood, California, United States
| 
|-
|Win
|align=center|17–1
|Alex Garcia
|KO (punches)
|UFC Fight Night: Cowboy vs. Cowboy
|
|align=center|3
|align=center|4:25
|Pittsburgh, Pennsylvania, United States
|
|-
|  Win
| align=center| 16–1
| Igor Araújo
| Decision (unanimous) 
| UFC Fight Night: Mir vs. Duffee
| 
| align=center| 3
| align=center| 5:00
| San Diego, California, United States
|
|-
| Loss
| align=center| 15–1
| Santiago Ponzinibbio
| Decision (unanimous)
| UFC Fight Night: Bigfoot vs. Mir
| 
| align=center| 3
| align=center| 5:00
| Porto Alegre, Brazil
| 
|-
| Win
| align=center| 15–0
| Luke Barnatt
| Decision (split)
| UFC Fight Night: Muñoz vs. Mousasi
| 
| align=center| 3
| align=center| 5:00
| Berlin, Germany
| 
|-
| Win
| align=center| 14–0
| Bubba McDaniel
| Submission (rear-naked choke)
| UFC 171
| 
| align=center| 1
| align=center| 4:33
| Dallas, Texas, United States
| 
|-
| Win
| align=center| 13–0
| Matt Lagler
| TKO (punches)
| KOTC: Split Decision
| 
| align=center| 1
| align=center| 4:59
| Highland, California, United States
| 
|-
| Win
| align=center| 12–0
| Yusuke Sakashita
| Decision (unanimous)
| KOTC: Worldwide
| 
| align=center| 5
| align=center| 5:00
| Manila, Philippines
| 
|-
| Win
| align=center| 11–0
| Bill Albrecht
| KO (punch)
| KOTC: Restitution
| 
| align=center| 1
| align=center| 2:41
| Los Angeles, California, United States
| 
|-
| Win
| align=center| 10–0
| Josh Bryant
| Decision (split)
| KOTC: Unification
| 
| align=center| 3
| align=center| 5:00
| Highland, California, United States
| 
|-
| Win
| align=center| 9–0
| Brandon Hunt
| TKO (punches)
| KOTC: Hardcore
| 
| align=center| 1
| align=center| 3:24
| Highland, California, United States
| 
|-
| Win
| align=center| 8–0
| Brandon Hunt
| TKO (punches)
| KOTC: Steel Curtain
| 
| align=center| 1
| align=center| 3:48
| Norman, Oklahoma, United States
| 
|-
| Win
| align=center| 7–0
| Brett Sbardella
| KO (punches)
| KOTC: Demolition
| 
| align=center| 1
| align=center| 1:03
| Walker, Minnesota, United States
| 
|-
| Win
| align=center| 6–0
| Donavin Hawkey
| Submission (rear-naked choke)
| KOTC: Platinum
| 
| align=center| 1
| align=center| 1:21
| Durban, South Africa
|
|-
| Win
| align=center| 5–0
| Adriel Montes
| TKO (punches)
| KOTC: Underground 63
| 
| align=center| 2
| align=center| 1:05
| Laughlin, Nevada, United States
| 
|-
| Win
| align=center| 4–0
| George Interiano
| Decision (unanimous)
| LBFN 7: Long Beach Fight Night 7
| 
| align=center| 3
| align=center| 5:00
| Long Beach, California, United States
|
|-
| Win
| align=center| 3–0
| William Wheeler
| Submission (rear-naked choke)
| KOTC: Jolted
| 
| align=center| 1
| align=center| 1:55
| Laughlin, Nevada, United States
| 
|-
| Win
| align=center| 2–0
| Brandon Ellsworth
| TKO (punches)
| KOTC: Last Resort
| 
| align=center| 1
| align=center| 1:28
| Laughlin, Nevada, United States
| 
|-
| Win
| align=center| 1–0
| Tyler Pottett
| Submission (rear-naked choke)
| KOTC: Protege
| 
| align=center| 2
| align=center| 1:53
| Laughlin, Nevada, United States
|

See also
 List of current UFC fighters
 List of male mixed martial artists

References

External links
 

Living people
American practitioners of Brazilian jiu-jitsu
American male mixed martial artists
1991 births
Mixed martial artists from California
Middleweight mixed martial artists
Mixed martial artists utilizing Brazilian jiu-jitsu
People from Anaheim, California
People from Commerce, California
Ultimate Fighting Championship male fighters
American agnostics